Nabil Hakim bin Bokhari (born 9 February 1999) is a Malaysian professional footballer who plays as a left-back for Kuala Lumpur City.

Honours
Malaysia U19
 AFF U-19 Youth Championship: 2018; runner-up: 2017

References

External links
 

1999 births
Living people
People from Kuala Lumpur
Petaling Jaya City FC players
Kuala Lumpur City F.C. players
Malaysian footballers
Malaysian people of Malay descent
Association football defenders
Malaysia Super League players